Bastille (stylised as BΔSTILLE) are a British rock band formed in London in 2010. They began as a solo project by singer-songwriter Dan Smith, who later decided to form a band. The four-piece is completed by Chris 'Woody' Wood, William Farquarson, and Kyle Simmons. The name of the band derives from Bastille Day – an event celebrated on Smith's birthday, 14 July.

In December 2010, EMI Music announced that they had offered Bastille a record contract with Virgin Records. Their debut single, "Overjoyed" was subsequently released in April 2012. Their first studio album, titled Bad Blood, was released in March 2013 and debuted atop the UK Albums Chart. The band was nominated for four Brit Awards at the 2014 ceremony, including for British Breakthrough Act, British Group, British Single of the Year and British Album of the Year, winning for British Breakthrough Act. As of November 2014, Bastille have sold over 5 million records in the US and 2.5 million records in the UK alone.

American Music Awards
The American Music Awards is an annually held awards ceremony for outstanding achievements for American artists in the record industry, which airs on ABC. Bastille has received no awards from three nominations.

|-
|align="center" rowspan="2" | 2014 ||rowspan="2" | Bastille || New Artist of the Year || 
|-
| Favorite Alternative Artist || 
|-
|2019||"Happier"||Collaboration of the Year||

APRA Music Awards
The APRA Music Awards are several award ceremonies run in Australia by Australasian Performing Right Association to recognise songwriting skills, sales and airplay performance by its members annually. Bastille has received no awards from two nominations.

|-
| 2014 || "Pompeii" || rowspan="2" | Most Performed International Work || 
|-
| 2020 || "Happier" ||

ASCAP Awards

ASCAP POP Awards
The annual ASCAP Pop Awards are held by the American Society of Composers, Authors and Publishers to honour the songwriters and publishers of the most performed pop songs.

|-
| 2019 || rowspan="2" | "Happier" || rowspan="2" | Most Performed Songs || 
|-
| 2020 ||

ASCAP London Music Awards

|-
| rowspan="3" | 2020 || rowspan="4" | "Happier" || Song of the Year || 
|-
| Top EDM Song || 
|-
| Top Streaming Song || 
|-
|| 2021 || Hot Dance/Electronic Song ||

Billboard Music Awards
The Billboard Music Awards is an annual awards show from Billboard Magazine. Bastille has received no awards from five nominations.

|-
| 2014 || Bastille || New Artist of the Year || 
|-
| rowspan="2" | 2015 || Bastille || Top Rock Artist|| 
|-
| "Pompeii" || Top Rock Song || 
|-
| rowspan="2" | 2019 ||rowspan="2" | "Happier" || Top Collaboration || 
|-
| Top Dance/Electronic Song||

BMI Awards
The BMI Awards are annual award ceremonies for songwriters in various genres organised by Broadcast Music, Inc.

BMI London Awards

|-
| 2017 || "Good Grief" || Pop Award ||

BMI Pop Awards

|-
| 2020 || "Happier" || Award Winning Songs ||

Brit Awards
The Brit Awards are the British Phonographic Industry's annual pop music awards. Bastille has received one award from six nominations.

|-
|align="center" rowspan="4" | 2014 ||rowspan="2" | Bastille || Best New Artist || 
|-
| British Group || 
|-
| "Bad Blood" || Best British Album || 
|-
| "Pompeii" || Song of the Year || 
|-
|align="center" rowspan="1" | 2017 || rowspan=2| Bastille || rowspan=2|  British Group || 
|-
|align="center" rowspan="1" | 2020 ||

ECHO Awards
The ECHO Awards is an annual awards ceremony presented by the Deutsche Phono-Akademie, an association of recording companies of Germany, to recognize outstanding achievement in the music industry.

|-
|2014
|"Bad Blood"
|International Band of the Year
|

Grammy Awards
The Grammy Awards is an annual music awards show held by the National Academy of Recording Arts and Sciences of the United States for outstanding achievements in the record industry. Bastille has been nominated for an award in 2015 Grammy Awards.

|-
|align="center" | 2015 || Bastille || Best New Artist ||

iHeart Radio Music Awards
iHeartRadio Music Awards is an inaugural music award show presented by Clear Channel Communications's platform iHeartRadio and NBC. Bastille has received no awards from two nominations.

|-
| 2014 || "Pompeii" || Alt Rock Song of the Year || 
|-
| 2015 || Bastille || Best New Artist || 
|-
|rowspan="2"|2019 
|rowspan="2"|"Happier"  
| Alternative Rock Song of the Year 
| 
|-
| Dance Song of the Year 
|

International Dance Music Awards
The International Dance Music Awards, established in 1985, are an annual awards show honoring dance and electronic artists.  It is a part of the Winter Music Conference, a weeklong electronic music event held annually.

|-
| style="text-align:center;"|2014
| "Pompeii"
| Best Alternative/Indie Rock Dance Track
|
|-
|2019
| "Happier"
| Best Pop/Electronic Song
|
|-

JIMtv Jimmie Awards
JIMtv Jimmie Awards is a Flemish award show hosted by the JIM television channel. Bastille has received one award from three nominations.

|-
|align="center" rowspan="3" | 2014 ||rowspan="2" | Bastille || International Breakthrough || 
|-
| Band International || 
|-
| Bad Blood || Album International ||

Nickelodeon Kids' Choice Awards
The Nickelodeon Kids' Choice Awards, also known as the KCAs or Kids Choice Awards, is an annual awards show that airs on the Nickelodeon cable channel, which is usually held on a Saturday night in late March or early April, that honors the year's biggest television, movie, and music acts, as voted by Nickelodeon viewers.

|-
|align="center" |2019 
|"Happier" (ft. Marshmello) 
| Favorite Collaboration 
| 
|}

MTV Awards

MTV Video Music Awards
The MTV Video Music Awards, established in 1985, are an annual awards show honoring the best in the music video medium.

|-
|2019
|"Happier"
|Best Dance Video
|

MTV Europe Music Awards
The MTV Europe Music Awards is an annual awards ceremony established in 1994 by MTV Europe for the best in European music. Bastille has received no awards from two nominations.

|-
|align="center" rowspan="2" | 2013 ||rowspan="2" | Bastille || Best Push Act || 
|-
| Best New Act ||

mtvU Woodie Awards
MTVU broadcasts its own semi-annual awards show, the Woodie Awards, which it states recognizes "the music voted best by college students". Bastille has received one award from two nominations.

|-
|align="center" rowspan="2" | 2014 || Bastille || Breaking Woodie || 
|-
| Cover of Miley Cyrus' "We Can't Stop" || Best Cover Woodie ||

NewNowNext Awards
The NewNowNext-Awards is an American annual entertainment awards show, presented by the lesbian, gay, bisexual and transgender-themed channel Logo. Launched in 2008, awards are presented both for LGBT-specific and general interest achievements in entertainment and pop culture. Bastille have received no awards from one nomination.

|-
|align="center" | 2014 || Bastille || Best New Music Group ||

NME Awards
The NME Awards is an annual music awards show in the United Kingdom, presented by the music magazine, NME. Founded in 1953, the awards are presented in music categories that have varied slightly over the years. Bastille have received two awards from seven nominations.

|-
|align="center" | 2015 || Bastille || Worst Band || 
|-
|align="center" rowspan="4" | 2017 ||rowspan="2" | Bastille || Best British Band || 
|-
| Best Live Band || 
|-
|"Wild World" || Best Album || 
|-
|"Good Grief" || Best Track || 
|-
|align="center" rowspan="2" | 2018 || Bastille || Best British Band || 
|-
|-
|I Know You ft. Craig David|| Best Collaboration ||

Q Awards
The Q Awards are hosted annually by the music magazine Q. Bastille has won one award from  two nominations.

|-
|align="center" rowspan=2" | 2016 ||"Wild World" || Best Album || 
|-
|"Good Grief" || Best Track ||

Radio X Awards
The Radio X awards are from a listener vote from songs compiled from over the year that have been played on the station.

|-
|| 2020 ||"What You Gonna Do???" || Record of the Year || 
|-

Teen Choice Awards
The Teen Choice Awards is an annual awards show that airs on the Fox Network. Bastille has received one award from one nomination.

|-
| 2014 || "Pompeii" || rowspan="2" |Choice Rock Song || 
|-
|rowspan="2"| 2019 || "Joy" || 
|-
|| "Happier" || Choice Electronic/Dance Song ||

UK Music Video Awards
The UK Music Video Awards is an annual celebration of creativity, technical excellence and innovation in music video and moving image for music. Bastille have won one award from three nominations.

|-
| 2013 || "Things We Lost In The Fire" || Best Colour Grade in a Video || 
|-
| 2015 || "Torn Apart" || Best Rock/Indie Video - UK || 
|-
| 2021 || "Distorted Light Beam" || Best Colour Grading in a Video ||

Webby Awards
The Webby Awards are awards for excellence on the Internet presented annually by The International Academy of Digital Arts and Sciences, a judging body composed of over two thousand industry experts and technology innovators.

|-
| 2020 || "Doom Days Web AR" || Music ||

World Music Awards
The World Music Awards is an international awards ceremony that annually honors recording artists based on worldwide sales figures provided by the International Federation of the Phonographic Industry. Bastille has received no awards from seven nominations.

|-
|align="center" rowspan="7" | 2014 || rowspan="2" | Bastille || Best Group || 
|-
| Best Live Act || 
|-
| Bad Blood || Best Album || 
|-
| rowspan="2" | "Pompeii" || Best Song || 
|-
| Best Video || 
|-
| rowspan="2" | "Of the Night" || Best Song || 
|-
| Best Video ||

References

External links
 

Awards
Lists of awards received by British musician
Lists of awards received by musical group